Olga Pauline Sjøgren (née Hagen, August 9, 1884 – November 8, 1960) was a Norwegian actress and singer. She excelled as a revue actress and operetta singer, and she became involved early in film. She was also known as Olga Almquist.

Family
Olga Sjøgren was the daughter of the tailor Erik Hagen and his Swedish-born wife Kristine Andersdotter. She married the actor Carl Johan Olaf Almquist (1879–1914) on June 28, 1902, and they had two sons. She then married the actor Josef Peder Marcus Sjøgren (1891–1927).

Life and work
Olga Pauline Hagen was a student at Ludovica Levy's Second Theater academy in 1899. After that, she was engaged with the Eldorado Theater, the Tivoli Theater, and the Kongshavn Summer Theater, all in her hometown of Kristiania (now Oslo).

She was later associated with the Stavanger Theater, the Falkberget Theater, and the Norwegian Operetta Company. She also toured with Bjørn Bjørnevik's Bjørnevik Theater, where she participated in more than 1,400 productions of the play Skjærgårdsflirt by Gideon Wahlberg. She also starred in the film version of Skjærgårdsflirt.

Theater roles
Rose in the operetta Les Premiers Pas (Norwegian title: Et Eventyr i Tyrol) by Daniel Auber and Adolphe Adam (Trondheim, 1906)
Ganymedes in the operetta Die schöne Galathée (Norwegian title: Den skjønne Galathea) by Franz von Suppé (Bygdøy Sjøbad, 1909)
Madam Grisk in the revue Christian Fredriksen by Thorleif Klausen (Kongsberg, 1914)
Turtelduen in the revue Christian Fredriksen by Thorleif Klausen (Kongsberg, 1914)
Katrine in Gideon Wahlberg's Skjærgårdsflirt

Filmography
1914: Fredriksen Fald as a servant girl (credited as Olga Almquist)
1932: Skjærgårdsflirt as Katrine, a servant girl at the Østerman house
1939: Hu Dagmar as Oline, a servant girl
1942: Trysil-Knut as a servant girl at the Kynsberg house

References

External links
 
 Olga Sjøgren at Sceneweb
 Olga Sjøgren at Filmfront

1884 births
1960 deaths
Norwegian stage actresses
Norwegian film actresses
Norwegian people of Swedish descent
20th-century Norwegian actresses
Actresses from Oslo